Vatoa (pronounced ) (known as Turtle Island after Cook's visit) is an outlier of Fiji's Lau Group.

History
Vatoa was the only island of present-day Fiji visited by James Cook.  The island was sighted on 2 July 1774.  The next day, a Sunday, the Master and some of Cook's crew went ashore:  Cook's chart shows the name Turtle Isle.

Geography
Vatoa has varied rainfall and is usually cool because of trade winds.

It is composed wholly of limestone (Koroqara Limestone, Tokalau Limestone Group), probably Late Miocene in age. A single village has a population around 300. Interesting old fortifications occupy the highest part of the island.

Government
Viliame Naupoto, a noted son of Vatoa, is currently Commander of the Republic of Fiji Military Forces. He once served as Director of Immigration and Deputy Commander of the Republic of Fiji Navy.

Shipwrecks of Vatoa and associated reef Vuata Vatoa
Some of the wrecks are listed below:

1825: Oeno, Whale ship, Vuata Vatoa
1840: Shylock, Whaler, Vuata Vatoa
1942: SS Thomas A. Edison, Cargo ship, Vuata Vatoa
1943: USS Grebe, Minesweeper, Vuata Vatoa
1962: Ragna Ringdal, Cargo ship, Vatoa

References

External links

Islands of Fiji
Lau Islands